The National Women's Hall of Fame (NWHF) is an American institution incorporated in 1969 by a group of men and women in Seneca Falls, New York, although it did not induct its first enshrinees until 1973. As of 2021, it had 303 inductees.

Inductees are nominated by members of the public and selected by a National Panel of Judges on the basis of the changes they created that affect the social, economic or cultural aspects of society; the significant national or global impact and results of change due to their achievement; and the enduring value of their achievements or changes. Induction ceremonies are held every odd- numbered year in the fall, with the names of the women to be honored announced earlier in the spring, usually during March, Women's History Month.

The NWHF is a private 501(c)(3) non-profit organization, with six employees as of 2021, funded by philanthropy, admissions, and other income. In July 2021, Jennifer Gabriel was named executive director.

Location
The National Women's Hall of Fame was hosted by Eisenhower College until 1979/1980, when the organization rented out a historic bank building in the Seneca Falls Historic District. The historic bank was renovated to house the NWHF's permanent exhibit, historical artifacts, and offices. In August 2020, the National Women's Hall of Fame opened its door to the third and final home: the historic Seneca Knitting Mill, which resides across the canal of the Women's Rights National Historical Park which includes the Wesleyan Chapel where the 1848 women's rights convention took place, an event that kickstarted the women's suffrage movement in America. This renovation and move into the historic Seneca Knitting Mill took several years to accomplish. 

In 2014, the organization's board undertook a $20 million capital campaign to fund the development of the 1844 Seneca Knitting Mill, which is associated with the abolitionist movement and with the birthplace of women's rights. The move and finalization of Phase 1 has currently doubled the size of the National Women's Hall of Fame. Currently, campaigning to work on Phase 2: an elevator, additional staircase, and other renovations is underway.

Inductees

A–J

Faye Glenn Abdellah
Bella Abzug
Abigail Adams
Jane Addams
Madeleine Albright
Tenley Albright
Louisa May Alcott
Florence E. Allen
Gloria Allred
Linda Alvarado
Dorothy H. Andersen
Marian Anderson
Ethel Percy Andrus
Maya Angelou
Susan B. Anthony
Virginia Apgar
Ella Baker
Lucille Ball
Ann Bancroft
Clara Barton
Eleanor K. Baum
Ruth Fulton Benedict
Mary McLeod Bethune
Antoinette Blackwell
Elizabeth Blackwell
Emily Blackwell
Amelia Bloomer
Nellie Bly
Louise Bourgeois
Margaret Bourke-White
Lydia Moss Bradley
Myra Bradwell
Mary Carson Breckinridge
Nancy Brinker
Gwendolyn Brooks
Pearl S. Buck
Betty Bumpers
Charlotte Bunch
Octavia Butler
St. Frances Xavier Cabrini
Mary Steichen Calderone
Annie Jump Cannon
Rachel Carson
Eleanor Rosalynn Smith Carter
Mary Ann Shadd Cary
Mary Cassatt
Willa Cather
Carrie Chapman Catt
Judy Chicago
Julia Child
Lydia Maria Child
Shirley Chisholm
Hillary Clinton
Jacqueline Cochran
Mildred Cohn
Bessie Coleman
Eileen Collins
Ruth Colvin
Rita Rossi Colwell
Joan Ganz Cooney
Mother Marianne Cope
Gerty Theresa Radnitz Cori
Jane Cunningham Croly
Matilda Cuomo
Angela Davis
Paulina Kellogg Wright Davis
Dorothy Day
Marian de Forest
Donna de Varona
Karen DeCrow
Sarah Deer
Emma Smith DeVoe
Emily Dickinson
Dorothea Dix
Elizabeth Hanford Dole
Marjory Stoneman Douglas
St. Katharine Drexel
Anne Dallas Dudley
Mary Barret Dyer
Amelia Earhart
Sylvia A. Earle
Catherine Shipe East
Crystal Eastman
Mary Baker Eddy
Marian Wright Edelman
Gertrude Ederle
Gertrude Belle Elion
Dorothy Harrison Eustis
Alice C. Evans
Geraldine Ferraro
Ella Fitzgerald
Jane Fonda
Betty Ford
Loretta C. Ford
Abby Kelley Foster
Aretha Franklin
Helen Murray Free
Betty Friedan
Margaret Fuller
Matilda Joslyn Gage
Ina May Gaskin
Althea Gibson
Lillian Moller Gilbreth
Charlotte Perkins Gilman
Ruth Bader Ginsburg
Maria Goeppert Mayer
Katharine Graham
Martha Graham
Temple Grandin
Ella T. Grasso
Marcia Greenberger
Martha Wright Griffiths
Sarah Grimké
Angelina Emily Grimke Weld
Mary Hallaren
Rebecca S. Halstead
Fannie Lou Hamer
Alice Hamilton
Mia Hamm
Lorraine Hansberry
Joy Harjo
Martha Matilda Harper
Patricia Roberts Harris
Helen Hayes
Dorothy Height
Beatrice Hicks
Barbara Hillary
Oveta Culp Hobby
Barbara Holdridge
Billie Holiday
Wilhelmina Cole Holladay
Jeanne Holm
Bertha Holt
Grace Murray Hopper
Julia Ward Howe
Emily Howland
Dolores Huerta
Helen LaKelly Hunt
Swanee Hunt
Zora Neale Hurston
Anne Hutchinson
Barbara Iglewski
Shirley Ann Jackson
Victoria Jackson
Mary Jacobi
Frances Wisebart Jacobs
Mae Jemison
Katherine Johnson
Barbara Rose Johns
Mary Harris Jones
Barbara Jordan

K–Z

Helen Keller
Leontine T. Kelly
Susan Kelly-Dreiss
Frances Oldham Kelsey
Nannerl Keohane
Jean Kilbourne
Billie Jean King
Coretta Scott King
Julie Krone
Elisabeth Kübler-Ross
Maggie Kuhn
Stephanie L. Kwolek
Henrietta Lacks
Susette La Flesche
Winona LaDuke
Carlotta Walls LaNier
Dorothea Lange
Sherry Lansing
Allie B. Latimer
Emma Lazarus
Lilly Ledbetter
Mildred Robbins Leet
Maya Lin
Anne Morrow Lindbergh
Patricia Locke
Belva Lockwood
Juliette Gordon Low
Clare Boothe Luce
Shannon W. Lucid
Mary Lyon
Mary Mahoney
Nicole Malachowski
Wilma Mankiller
Philippa Marrack
Barbara McClintock
Katharine Dexter McCormick
Louise McManus
Margaret Mead
Barbara Mikulski
Kate Millett
Patsy Takemoto Mink
Maria Mitchell
Toni Morrison
Constance Baker Motley
Lucretia Mott
Kate Mullany
Aimee Mullins
Carol Mutter
Indra Nooyi
Antonia Novello
Sandra Day O'Connor
Georgia O'Keeffe
Rose O'Neill
Annie Oakley
Michelle Obama
Rosa Parks
Ruth Patrick
Alice Paul
Nancy Pelosi
Mary Engle Pennington
Frances Perkins
Rebecca Talbot Perkins
Esther Peterson
Judith L. Pipher
Jeannette Rankin
Janet Reno
Ellen Swallow Richards
Linda Richards
Sally Ride
Rozanne L. Ridgway
Edith Nourse Rogers
Mary Joseph Rogers
Eleanor Roosevelt
Ernestine Louise Potowski Rose
Sister Elaine Roulet
Janet Rowley
Wilma Rudolph
Josephine St. Pierre Ruffin
Mary Harriman Rumsey
Florence Sabin
Sacagawea
Bernice Sandler
Margaret Sanger
Katherine Siva Saubel
Betty Bone Schiess
Ann Schonberger
Patricia Schroeder
Anna Schwartz
Felice N. Schwartz
Blanche Stuart Scott
Florence B. Seibert
Elizabeth Ann Seton
Donna Shalala
Anna Howard Shaw
Catherine Filene Shouse
Eunice Mary Kennedy Shriver
Muriel Siebert
Beverly Sills
Louise Slaughter
Eleanor Smeal
Bessie Smith
Margaret Chase Smith
Sophia Smith
Hannah Greenebaum Solomon
Susan Solomon
Sonia Sotomayor
Laurie Spiegel
Elizabeth Cady Stanton
Gloria Steinem
Helen Stephens
Nettie Stevens
Lucy Stone
Kate Stoneman
Harriet Beecher Stowe
Harriet Williams Russell Strong
Anne Sullivan
Kathrine Switzer
Henrietta Szold
Mary Burnett Talbert
Maria Tallchief
Ida Tarbell
Helen Brooke Taussig
Mary Church Terrell
Sojourner Truth
Harriet Tubman
Wilma Vaught
Diane von Furstenberg
Florence Schorske Wald
Lillian Wald
Madam C. J. Walker
Mary Edwards Walker
Emily Howell Warner
Mercy Otis Warren
Alice Waters
Faye Wattleton
Annie Dodge Wauneka
Ida Wells-Barnett
Eudora Welty
Edith Wharton
Sheila E. Widnall
Emma Willard
Frances Willard
Oprah Winfrey
Sarah Winnemucca
Flossie Wong-Staal
Victoria Woodhull
Fanny Wright
Martha Coffin Pelham Wright
Chien-Shiung Wu
Rosalyn Yalow
Gloria Yerkovich
Mildred "Babe" Didrikson Zaharias

References

External links

Brief biographies of the women who will next be inducted 
National Women's Hall of Fame in Seneca Falls

Women
Women's halls of fame
History of women in New York (state)
Women's museums in the United States
Biographical museums in New York (state)
Museums in Seneca County, New York
Awards established in 1969
Seneca Falls, New York